Old Brick Warehouse was an historic tobacco warehouse located at Mullins, Marion County, South Carolina. It was built between 1903 and 1908, and is a 1 1/2 story, brick building with stepped parapets.  The original portion of the building has a slightly gabled roof. A 1960s addition had a flat built-up roof. All elevations contain loading and drive-in bays. It is believed to be the first brick tobacco warehouse in Mullins.

It was listed on the National Register of Historic Places in 1984.  It was located in the Mullins Commercial Historic District.  Demolition on the structure began on July 31, 2014.

See also 
 Neal and Dixon's Warehouse: Another historic tobacco warehouse in Mullins

References

Commercial buildings on the National Register of Historic Places in South Carolina
Buildings and structures in Marion County, South Carolina
Warehouses on the National Register of Historic Places
Commercial buildings completed in 1908
Industrial buildings and structures on the National Register of Historic Places in South Carolina
National Register of Historic Places in Marion County, South Carolina
Historic district contributing properties in South Carolina
Tobacco buildings in the United States
1908 establishments in South Carolina
Demolished buildings and structures in South Carolina
Buildings and structures demolished in 2014